Owslebury Bottom is a hamlet in the civil parish of Owslebury in the City of Winchester district of Hampshire, England. William Cobbett rode through the hamlet in his 1820s book Rural Rides. He described it as "half a dozen timbered houses in the ownership of Lord Mildmay, a small church of recent construction, and a tract of good soil used to cultivate wheat, being of good quality, of which the majority is milled at the City Mill in Winchester".

It is served by a bus from Winchester around once every two hours.

Hamlets in Hampshire